Singles Collection Volume 2 is a b-side and rarities compilation album released by Boston punk rock band Dropkick Murphys, on March 8, 2005. The album, which peaked at No. 26 and spent three weeks on the chart, contains songs released on singles, compilations and splits. Among the songs, two are alternate versions of songs previously released on Dropkick Murphys albums, five songs were written by the band (one of which was co-written with The Business) and the rest were covers. The artists covered range from mainstream rock bands such as AC/DC and Creedence Clearwater Revival to influential punk bands such as Sham 69 and Cock Sparrer.

"We Got the Power", a song about the 1919 Boston Police Strike also appeared on Fat Wreck Chords's 2004 compilation album Rock Against Bush, Vol. 2.

Song information

Track listing
 "21 Guitar Salute" (Andre Schlesinger) – 2:40
 "Fortunate Son" (John Fogerty) – 2:38
 "On the Attack" (Dropkick Murphys) – 1:26
 "You're a Rebel" (Iron Cross) – 2:42
 "Watch Your Back" (Mick Beaufoy, Steve Bruce, Steve Burgess, Colin McFaull) – 1:54
 "Vengeance" (Shane MacGowan, K Bradley) – 2:38
 "It's a Long Way to the Top (If You Wanna Rock 'n' Roll)" (Angus Young, Malcolm Young, Bon Scott) – 4:43
 "Warlords" (The F.U.'s) – 2:23
 "Alcohol" (Chris Doherty, Chuck Stilphen) – 1:54
 "Pipebomb on Lansdowne (Dance Remix)" (Dropkick Murphys) – 2:00
 "Nobody’s Hero" (Stiff Little Fingers, Gordon Ogilvie) – 3:42
 "Mob Mentality" (Dropkick Murphys, The Business) – 2:18
 "Informer" (The Business) – 1:56
 "The Nutrocker (Instrumental) (Nutty)" (Kim Fowley) – 1:17
 "Rock 'n' Roll" (Phil Campbell, Würzel, Lemmy, Phil Taylor) – 3:27
 "Hey Little Rich Boy" (Sham 69) – 1:29
 "Never Again" (Angelic Upstarts) – 2:52
 "Halloween" (Glenn Danzig) – 1:34
 "Soundtrack to a Killing Spree" (Dropkick Murphys) – 1:36
 "Wild Rover" (Traditional, Dropkick Murphys) – 3:24
 "Working" (Mick Beaufoy, Steve Bruce, Steve Burgess, Colin McFaull) – 2:38
 "Victory" (Michael J. Shea) – 1:43
 "We Got the Power" (Dropkick Murphys) – 2:46

Personnel
 Al Barr – vocals
 Rick Barton – guitar
 James Lynch – guitar, vocals
 Marc Orrell – guitar, vocals
 Ken Casey – bass
 Matt Kelly – drums
 Joe Delaney – bagpipes on "21 Guitar Salute" and "Mob Mentality"
 Lars Frederiksen - guest vocals on "Vengeance"
 Dicky Barrett - guest vocals on "Rock 'n' Roll"
 Shane Macgowan - guest vocals on "The Wild Rover"

References

2005 compilation albums
B-side compilation albums
Dropkick Murphys albums
Hellcat Records compilation albums